Peng Yisong (born 13 November 2001) is a Chinese professional snooker player.

Peng turned professional in 2022 having earned his place through the CBSA China Tour and gained a two-year tour card for the 2022–23 and 2023–24 snooker seasons.

Performance and rankings timeline

External links
 Peng Yisong at wst.tv

2001 births
Living people
Chinese snooker players
21st-century Chinese people